Neon Horse was an American rock band from Los Angeles, California, formed by Mark Salomon, Jason Martin and Steven Dail. They were previously signed to Tooth & Nail Records with whom they have released two studio albums. Neon Horse's sound has been described as a being influenced by the music of the 1980s.

Members

Stavesacre lead singer Mark Salomon and Starflyer 59 founder Jason Martin wrote all songs on the band's first album. The September 2007 issue of Alternative Press states, "[Y]ou'll notice that you never see them in the same room at the same time with members of Stavesacre, Starflyer 59 and Joy Electric."

On April 10, 2008 Neon Horse performed live at the House of Blues in Anaheim.  Mark Salomon (of Stavesacre) was the singer, Jason Martin (of Starflyer 59) played guitar, and Steven Dail (of Project 86 and Crash Rickshaw) played bass.

On July 28, 2009, their second album titled "Haunted Horse: Songs of Love, Defiance, and Delusion" was made available for purchase in both mp3 and CD format.

As of 2011, Neon Horse's artist profile is no longer featured on the Tooth & Nail Records' 'Current Artists' website. No new information about the band has been given.

Members
Confirmed members
 Mark Salomon – vocals (Stavesacre, the Crucified, Argyle Park)
 Jason Martin – guitars, backing vocals (Starflyer 59, Dance House Children, the Brothers Martin)
 Steven Dail – bass (Project 86, Starflyer 59, Crash Rickshaw)
 Possibly Ronnie Martin – keyboards (Joy Electric, Dance House Children, and the Brothers Martin)

Session
 Alex Albert – drums (Project 86, Crash Rickshaw, Focused)

Discography

Music videos
"Cuckoo!" - 2007
"Strange Town" - 2009

References

External links
Official Myspace
Official Purevolume

Musical groups from Los Angeles
Musical groups established in 2007
Tooth & Nail Records artists